Callum Reid (born 16 January 1999) is an Irish rugby union player who plays loosehead prop for United Rugby Championship side Ulster.

He was part of the Ireland under-20 team that won the Grand Slam in the 2019 Six Nations Under 20s Championship. He played for Banbridge RFC for a season while in the Ulster sub-academy, and joined the academy ahead of the 2019–20 season. He made his Ulster debut in Round 10 of the 2020–21 Pro14 against , making five appearances from the bench during the 2020–21 season, and spent six weeks on loan with Munster. He signed a development contract ahead of the 2021–22 season season, and made another five appearances from the bench, including against the Stormers in Cape Town, when he scored a controversially disallowed try. He was selected for the Emerging Ireland squad for the Toyota Challenge in South Africa in September 2022.

References

External links
Ulster Rugby profile
United Rugby Championship profile

1999 births
Living people
Irish rugby union players
Ulster Rugby players
Rugby union props
Munster Rugby players